Commodity Exchange Bratislava, JSC formerly BMKB, then BCE, now CEB is a European commodity exchange made for organising market with commodities according to adjudication of Ministry of Economy of the Slovak Republic. CEB is the only organizer of the commodity market in Slovakia. CEB is the first exchange that has started non-stop online trading and clearing.

Markets 
Primary markets on the exchange are:
 Emission trading
 Agricultural trading
 Investment diamonds

Web services 
Commodity Exchange Bratislava runs project EUAMarket.com. Traders are allowed also to use web services to trade at the market by programming languages.

Security 
CEB uses several guarantee systems, and settling company to provide additional security.
 Guarantee system 1 - collateral 2% of the contract value
 Guarantee system 2 - full payment or delivery before an order
 OTC market - no guarantees, only contact information is exchanged

Settling company 
Settling company provides additional security in terms of that two independent companies are required to sign the outgoing transaction. The settling company at CEB is LINNA.

References

External links 
 Commodity Exchange Bratislava website
 CEB knowledge base
 Official CEB trading section for carbon credits - Carbon Place
 Official CEB trading section for diamonds
 Official CEB trading section for MON contracts (Agrocommodities market with future delivery)

Stock exchanges in Europe
Climate change policy
Commodity exchanges